George Gheverghese Joseph, also known as G. G. Joseph is an Indian-born African mathematician who is a specialist in the history of mathematics. His works are mainly focused on the achievements of Kerala school of astronomy and mathematics and the transmission of mathematics from India to Europe.

Early life and works
George Gheverghese Joseph was born in Kerala, India. At the age of 9, his family moved to Mombasa, Kenya and he pursued his schooling in Kenya. He completed his degree in mathematics at the University of Leicester. After completing his degree, he worked as a school teacher for six years in Kenya and, then he did a master's degree at the University of Manchester, England. He qualified in Law in 2000. 

G. G. Joseph studied and conducted researches in applied mathematics and statistics, including multivariate analysis, mathematical programming, and demography. He is conducting three-month research on the history of mathematics in his native place every year. Through his series of researches, he claimed that the infinite series was invented by Kerala mathematicians in 1350, before Europeans.

Bibliography
The Crest of the Peacock: Non-European Roots of Mathematics, Princeton University Press, 1991.
 A Passage to Infinity: Medieval Indian Mathematics from Kerala and its Impact, 2009.
Kerala Mathematics: History and Its Possible Transmission to Europe, 2009.
Multicultural Mathematics: Teaching Mathematics from a Global Perspective (with David Nelson and Julian Williams), 1993.
Women at Work: The British Experience, 1983.

References 

A Passage to Infinity
The Crest of the Peacock

Living people
Year of birth missing (living people)
Indian mathematicians
African mathematicians
History of mathematics
Scientists from Kerala
Alumni of the University of Leicester
Alumni of the University of Manchester
Indian emigrants to Kenya